Lee Young-chang (born 10 January 1993) is a South Korean footballer who plays as goalkeeper for Bucheon FC 1995 in K League 2.

Career
He was selected by Chungju Hummel in 2015 K League draft.

References

External links 

1993 births
Living people
Association football goalkeepers
South Korean footballers
Chungju Hummel FC players
Daejeon Hana Citizen FC players
Bucheon FC 1995 players
K League 2 players
Hongik University alumni
South Korean Buddhists